Medical help may in some instances be accompanied by embarrassment.

Features
The source of this embarrassment or its range can vary from person to person. For some the embarrassment heightens when confronted by specific characteristics, such as a doctor of the opposite sex, while for others, the scope of their embarrassment may be exhaustive regardless of the social or peer group dynamics. For others, the embarrassment factor may be overarching, especially when at a disadvantaged socioeconomic situation, for example one who needs financial assistance to obtain medical help. In these scenarios the embarrassment may be duplicated due to a possible scenario wherein they are to be examined by both a doctor and perhaps if underage, a parent, or if an adult of low socioeconomic circumstances, perhaps a social worker.

See also
 Self-esteem
 Social stigma

References

Prudishness
Public health